Sinopharm COVID-19 vaccine may refer to:
Sinopharm BIBP COVID-19 vaccine
Sinopharm CNBG COVID-19 vaccine
Sinopharm WIBP COVID-19 vaccine

Chinese COVID-19 vaccines